This is a list of the land border crossings of Pakistan with its four neighbours, namely Afghanistan, China, India, and Iran.

Afghanistan

Land

There are six official border crossings and trade terminals between Afghanistan and Pakistan, although there are also numerous unofficial and illegal border crossings used by locals, smugglers, and terrorists. However the Pakistani government is trying to stop cross-border infiltration by constructing the Afghanistan–Pakistan barrier.

Rail
 Currently there is no operational railway crossings between Pakistan and Afghanistan, However Pakistan Railways was planning to lay new railway track between two  countries to boost business activities.

China

Road

 The Khunjerab Pass is the only modern-day border crossing between China and Pakistan which can be accessed via the Karakoram Highway. Historically, the Mintaka Pass and Kilik Pass have also been used; however those crossings do not have vehicle access and are closed.

Proposed 

 A border crossing near Mustagh Pass has been proposed as an alternative CPEC route in order to shorten the route to China, which would also connect AJ&K.

Rail
 A 982-kilometre Khunjerab Railway line has been proposed between Pakistan and China, which will extend from Havelian railway station to Kashgar–Hotan railway.

India

Land
Currently, there is only one fully-fledged international border crossing open between India and Pakistan – the Wagah-Attari border. It is famous for its Wagah border ceremony which take place every evening. Moreover, the Kartarpur Corridor serves Indian pilgrims, who are able to visit Gurdwara Darbar Sahib Kartarpur visa-free.

Rail
 Wagah / Attari, the Samjhauta Express between Lahore and Amritsar/Delhi crosses here. Closed since 2019
 Munabao / Khokhrapar, the Thar Express between Karachi and Jodhpur crosses here. Closed since 2019.

Iran

Road

Rail
 Taftan / Mirjaveh, on the line between Quetta and Zahedan

References 

border
Border crossings of Pakistan